Peter-Huchel-Preis is a literature prize awarded in Baden-Württemberg, Germany. The Peter Huchel Prize for German-language poetry, donated by the state of Baden-Württemberg and Südwestrundfunk, has been awarded since 1983 for an outstanding lyric work of the previous year. The award is endowed with €10,000 and is presented annually on 3 April, Peter Huchel's birthday, in Staufen im Breisgau.

Winners

1984 Manfred Peter Hein, Gegenzeichnung
1985 Guntram Vesper, Die Inseln im Landmeer und neue Gedichte
1986 Michael Krüger, Die Dronte
1987 Wulf Kirsten, Die Erde bei Meißen
1988 Elke Erb, Kastanienallee
1989 Luise Schmidt, Die Finsternis die freie Existenz
1990 Ernst Jandl, Idyllen
1991 Günter Herburger, Das brennende Haus
1992 Ludwig Greve (posthum), Sie lacht und andere Gedichte
1993 Sarah Kirsch, Erlkönigs Tochter
1994 Jürgen Becker, Foxtrott im Erfurter Stadion
1995 Durs Grünbein, Falten und Fallen
1996 Gregor Laschen, Jammerbugt-Notate
1997 Thomas Kling, morsch
1998 Brigitte Oleschinski, Your Passport is Not Guilty
1999 Raoul Schrott, Tropen. Über das Erhabene
2000 Adolf Endler, Der Pudding der Apokalypse
2001 Oskar Pastior, Villanella & Pantum
2002 Wolfgang Hilbig, Bilder vom Erzählen
2003 Rolf Haufs, Ebene der Fluß
2004 Hans Thill, Kühle Religionen
2005 Nicolas Born (posthum), Gedichte
2006 Uljana Wolf, kochanie ich habe brot gekauft
2007 Oswald Egger, Tag und Nacht sind zwei Jahre
2008 Ulf Stolterfoht, holzrauch über heslach
2009 Gerhard Falkner, Hölderlin Reparatur
2010 Friederike Mayröcker, dieses Jäckchen (nämlich) des Vogel Greif
2011 Marion Poschmann, Geistersehen
2012 Nora Bossong, Sommer vor den Mauern
2013 Monika Rinck, Honigprotokolle
2014 Steffen Popp, Dickicht mit Reden und Augen
2015 Paulus Böhmer, Zum Wasser will alles Wasser will weg
2016 Barbara Köhler, Istanbul, zusehends
2017 Orsolya Kalász, Das Eine
2018 Farhad Showghi, Wolkenflug spielt Zerreißprobe
2019 Thilo Krause, Was wir reden, wenn es gewittert
2020 Henning Ziebritzki, Vogelwerk
2021 Marcel Beyer, Dämonenräumdienst
2022 Dinçer Güçyeter, Mein Prinz, ich bin das Ghetto

References

External links

Literary awards of Baden-Württemberg